Mrs. Parker and the Vicious Circle is a 1994 American biographical drama film directed by Alan Rudolph from a screenplay written by Rudolph and Randy Sue Coburn. The film stars Jennifer Jason Leigh as writer Dorothy Parker and depicts the members of the Algonquin Round Table, a group of writers, actors and critics who met almost every weekday from 1919 to 1929 at Manhattan's Algonquin Hotel.

The film was an Official Selection at the 1994 Cannes Film Festival and was nominated for the Palme d'Or. The film was a critical but not a commercial success. Leigh won the National Society of Film Critics Award for Best Actress.

Peter Benchley, who plays editor Frank Crowninshield, was the grandson of humorist Robert Benchley, who once worked underneath Crowninshield. Actor Wallace Shawn is the son of William Shawn, the longtime editor of The New Yorker.

Cast

 Jennifer Jason Leigh as Dorothy Parker
 Campbell Scott as Robert Benchley
 Matthew Broderick as Charles MacArthur
 Peter Gallagher as Alan Campbell
 Jennifer Beals as Gertrude Benchley
 Andrew McCarthy as Eddie Parker (Edwin Pond Parker II)
 Wallace Shawn as Horatio Byrd
 Martha Plimpton as Jane Grant
 Sam Robards as Harold Ross
 Lili Taylor as Edna Ferber
 James LeGros as Deems Taylor
 Gwyneth Paltrow as Paula Hunt
 Nick Cassavetes as Robert Sherwood
 David Thornton as George S. Kaufman
 Heather Graham as Mary Kennedy Taylor
 Tom McGowan as Alexander Woollcott
 Chip Zien as Franklin P. Adams
 Gary Basaraba as Heywood Broun
 Jane Adams as Ruth Hale
 Stephen Baldwin as Roger Spalding
 Matt Malloy as Marc Connelly
 Rebecca Miller as Neysa McMein
 Jake Johannsen as John Peter Toohey
 Amelia Campbell as Mary Brandon Sherwood
 David Gow as Donald Ogden Stewart
 Leni Parker as Beatrice Kaufman
 J. M. Henry as Harpo Marx
 Stanley Tucci as Newt Hunter
 Mina Badie as Joanie Gerard
 Randy Lowell as Alvan Barach

Given the historical impact of many of the people portrayed in the film, the ensemble nature of the cast led to opening credits displaying all 30 actors listed above. Other historical characters, in brief appearances, included portrayals by Keith Carradine as Will Rogers, Jon Favreau as Elmer Rice, lead character Robert Benchley's grandson – Jaws author Peter Benchley – as Frank Crowninshield, Malcolm Gets as F. Scott Fitzgerald and Gisele Rousseau as Polly Adler.

Production

Development 
Director Alan Rudolph was fascinated with the Algonquin Round Table as a child when he discovered Gluyas Williams' illustrations in a collection of Robert Benchley's essays. Speaking in 1995, he said "the Algonquin Hotel round table, what it symbolised, and the ripple effect that went out from it, was probably up there in the 50 most significant events of the century". After making The Moderns, a film about American expatriates in 1920s Paris, Rudolph wanted to tackle a fact-based drama set in the same era. He began work on a screenplay with novelist and former Washington Star journalist Randy Sue Coburn about legendary writer Dorothy Parker. In 1992, Rudolph attended a Fourth of July party hosted by filmmaker Robert Altman who introduced him to actress Jennifer Jason Leigh. Rudolph was surprised by her physical resemblance to Parker and was impressed by her knowledge of the Jazz Age. Leigh was so committed to doing the film that she agreed to make it for "a tenth of what I normally get for a film".

The screenplay originally focused on the platonic relationship between Parker and Robert Benchley, but this did not appeal to any financial backers. There still was no interest even when Altman came on board as producer. The emphasis on Parker was the next change to the script, but Rudolph still had no luck finding financing for "a period biography of a literate woman." Altman used his clout to persuade Fine Line Features and Miramax—two studios he was making films for—to team, with the former releasing Mrs. Parker and the Vicious Circle domestically and the latter handling foreign distribution. Altman claimed that he forced the film to be made by putting his own money into it, adding,  "I put other projects of mine hostage to it. I did a lot of lying".

Filming 
Rudolph shot the film in Montreal because the building facades in its old city most closely resembled period New York City. Full financing was not acquired until four weeks into principal photography.

The film's large cast followed Leigh's lead and agreed to work for much lower than their usual salaries. Rudolph invited them to write their own dialogue, which resulted in a chaotic first couple of days of principal photography. Actor Campbell Scott remembered "Everyone hung on to what they knew about their characters and just sort of threw it out there." Actress Jennifer Beals discussed this in her appearance on the Jon Favreau program Dinner for Five, where she stated that while much dialogue was improvised in the style of the real-life characters the actors were playing, many of these characters were not integral to the plot. As such, many of the actors had much larger parts that were edited down to nearly nothing in the film’s final cut. 

During the film’s 40-day shoot, the cast stayed in a run-down hotel dubbed Camp Rudolph and engaged in all-night poker games. Leigh chose not to participate in these activities, preferring to stay in character on and off camera. She did a great amount of research for the role and said "I wanted to be as close to her as I possibly could." To this end, Leigh stayed at the Algonquin Hotel for a week and read Parker's entire body of work. In addition, the actress listened repeatedly to the two existing audio recordings of Parker in order to perfect the writer's distinctive voice. Leigh found that Parker "had a sensibility that I understand very, very well. A sadness. A depression."

Reception
A rough cut of Mrs. Parker and the Vicious Circle was screened at the 1993 Cannes Film Festival where it divided film critics. It was rumored afterwards that Leigh re-recorded several scenes that were too difficult to understand because of her accent but she denied that this happened. The film was an Official Selection at the 1994 Cannes Film Festival and was nominated for the Palme d'Or.

For her performance in the film, Leigh was nominated for both the Golden Globe Award for Best Actress in a Motion Picture – Drama and Independent Spirit Award for Best Female Lead.

Year-end lists 
 4th – Michael Mills, The Palm Beach Post
 6th – Desson Howe, The Washington Post
 10th – Scott Schuldt, The Oklahoman
 Top 10 (listed alphabetically, not ranked) – Jimmy Fowler, Dallas Observer
 Top 10 (not ranked) – Betsy Pickle, Knoxville News-Sentinel
 Honorable mention – Jeff Simon, The Buffalo News
 Honorable mention –  Glenn Lovell, San Jose Mercury News
 Honorable mention – Michael MacCambridge, Austin American-Statesman

References

External links 
 
 

1994 films
1994 drama films
1990s biographical drama films
1990s English-language films
American biographical drama films
Films directed by Alan Rudolph
Films scored by Mark Isham
Films set in hotels
Films set in Manhattan
Films set in the 1920s
Films set in the 1930s
Films set in the 1940s
Films set in the 1950s
Films shot in Montreal
Cultural depictions of American women
Cultural depictions of F. Scott Fitzgerald
Cultural depictions of Will Rogers
Cultural depictions of writers
Biographical films about writers
Algonquin Round Table
1994 independent films
1990s American films
American independent films